Jason Dunn may refer to:
 Jason Dunn (American football) (born 1973), American football tight end
 Jason Dunn (soccer) (born 1971), retired American soccer forward
 Jason Dunn (singer), former lead singer of the Christian rock band Hawk Nelson
Jason Dunn, owner of Facedown Records, drummer for No Innocent Victim
 Jason R. Dunn, American attorney